Radek Řechka (born 12 November 1975) is a Czech bobsledder. He competed in the four man event at the 2006 Winter Olympics.

References

External links
 

1975 births
Living people
Czech male bobsledders
Olympic bobsledders of the Czech Republic
Bobsledders at the 2006 Winter Olympics
Sportspeople from Příbram